Visbretinden is a mountain in Lom Municipality in Innlandet county, Norway. It is the 41st tallest mountain in Norway. The mountain is surrounded by several other notable mountains including Urdadalstindene and Semelholstinden to the northeast; Semeltinden to the southeast; Skarddalstinden and Skarddalseggi o to the south; Høgvagltindene and Langvasshøi to the southwest; Kyrkja and Kyrkjeoksli to the west; and Tverrbytthornet to the northwest.

See also
List of mountains of Norway by height

References

Jotunheimen
Lom, Norway
Mountains of Innlandet